Dick Hunsaker (born April 11, 1954) is an American college basketball coach and the former head men's basketball coach at Utah Valley University. He is also a former head and assistant coach at Ball State University. As one of Rick Majerus's assistant coaches, he worked with the Cardinals for two seasons, including their berth in the 1989 NCAA Division I men's basketball tournament.

Hunsaker is best known for leading Ball State to the 1990 tournament. His team was led by University of Arkansas at Little Rock transfers Paris McCurdy and Curtis Kidd, Muncie natives Chandler Thompson and Billy Butts, and Detroit native Scott Nichols. The team, as a number 12 seed, defeated Oregon State University, which was led by Gary Payton in the first round and University of Louisville in the second round, before falling to eventual champions UNLV. His record while at Ball State was 97–33.

Hunsaker left Ball State in 1993 in the midst of an NCAA Investigation, but claims to have never violated any rules. He coached the next two years in the Continental Basketball Association with Fort Wayne, Hartford and Grand Rapids. In 1995, he returned to the collegiate coaching ranks at Manchester College, where his record was 51–27.

His next coaching job was at the University of Utah, where he served as an assistant to Rick Majerus in his final years. Majerus took a leave of absence after the 2000–01 season opener due to health problems, and Hunsaker became interim head coach. Majerus had every intention of returning, but announced in January 2001 that he would sit out the remainder of the season to tend to his health and that of his mother. As acting head coach in 2001, Hunsaker led the Utes to an 18–12 record. He took the head coaching position at Utah Valley State in 2002. His first season at Utah Valley State was the school's last year as a junior college. Utah Valley joined Division I in 2009.

Hunsaker is a Latter Day Saint.

Playing career
Hunsaker enrolled at UTEP in 1972. However, he transferred to Weber State after one year. He graduated from Weber State in 1977. He received a master's degree from BYU.

Head coaching record

References 

1954 births
Living people
American men's basketball coaches
American men's basketball players
Ball State Cardinals men's basketball coaches
Brigham Young University alumni
Continental Basketball Association coaches
Latter Day Saints from Indiana
Latter Day Saints from Utah
Manchester Spartans men's basketball coaches
Utah Utes men's basketball coaches
Utah Valley Wolverines men's basketball coaches
UTEP Miners men's basketball players
Weber State Wildcats men's basketball coaches
Weber State Wildcats men's basketball players